Head direction may refer to:

Head direction cells in biology
Head-directionality parameter in linguistics